Léonel Saint-Preux (born February 12, 1985, in Cap-Haïtien, Haiti) is a Haitian footballer who last played as a forward for Atlético Vega Real in 2018.

Career

Club
Saint-Preux began his career with Haitian club Zénith, where he was generally regarded as one of the most promising footballing talents in the Ligue Haïtienne.

Saint-Preux signed with Minnesota Thunder of the USL First Division on April 15, 2009., and scored on his debut on April 18, 2009, in a game against the Austin Aztex. He then spent an extended period with Vietnamies club based in Hanoi.

In early March 2010 he pre-signed a two-year contract with the Aztex, against whom he made his USL debut in 2009, but he was released before the season started after failing his medical.

International
Saint-Preux has represented Haiti at various youth levels. He was a member of Haiti's qualifying squad for the 2008 Beijing Olympics, scoring a memorable 40 yard goal in his nation's 2–1 victory over Canada. He debuted for the full Haitian national team in 2007, and has since participated in several World Cup qualifying matches. He scored his first international goal on November 19, 2008, in a 1–1 tie against Suriname.

Honors
''Prix d'Honneur et d'Excellence  -Association Jeunesse Excalibur/Global Youth Action Network, November 2008- International goalsScores and results list Haiti's goal tally first.''

References

External links
Minnesota Thunder bio

1985 births
Living people
Association football forwards
Haitian footballers
People from Cap-Haïtien
Haiti international footballers
2009 CONCACAF Gold Cup players
2013 CONCACAF Gold Cup players
2014 Caribbean Cup players
Minnesota Thunder players
Felda United F.C. players
USL First Division players
Azam F.C. players
Haitian expatriate footballers
Haitian expatriate sportspeople in the United States
Expatriate soccer players in the United States
Haitian expatriate sportspeople in Malaysia
Expatriate footballers in Malaysia
Haitian expatriate sportspeople in Tanzania
Expatriate footballers in Tanzania
Haitian expatriate sportspeople in Bangladesh
Expatriate footballers in Bangladesh
Haitian expatriate sportspeople in the Dominican Republic
Expatriate footballers in the Dominican Republic